The Silverdome, Australia's first indoor velodrome, is an indoor sporting and entertainment venue located in Launceston, Tasmania built in 1984. The Silverdome was built at an estimated cost of A$4 million, as the Tasmanian Government "proposed a world class facility" to replace the run down velodrome in the Launceston suburb of St Leonards. In January 1985, the facility's opening coincided with the City of Launceston Cycling Club Championships. Although "custom built for cycling", the Silverdome has hosted various concerts and other sporting events. The Collingwood Magpies Netball team, who compete in the Suncorp Super Netball league, have played a home match each season at the venue.

After hosting games during the NBL Blitz the season prior, on 3 March 2021 the National Basketball League announced that the venue would host six games during the 2020–21 NBL season in preparation for the Tasmania JackJumpers joining the league the following season. The first match was held on 13 April when the New Zealand Breakers lost to the Perth Wildcats in overtime. Since the 2021–22 NBL season, the JackJumpers host two games per season at the arena.

The capacity of the venue is 5,000.

Notes

References

External links

The Silverdome

 Transcript of proceedings by State Government regarding the Silverdome

National Basketball League (Australia) venues
Basketball venues in Australia
Sports venues in Tasmania
Velodromes in Australia
Tasmanian Magpies
Collingwood Magpies Netball
Buildings and structures in Launceston, Tasmania
1984 establishments in Australia
Sports venues completed in 1984
Netball venues in Tasmania
Tasmania JackJumpers
Basketball in Tasmania